Gala Union is a union of Tangail Sadar Upazila, Tangail District, Bangladesh. It is situated 4 km north of Tangail, The District Headquarter.

Demographics

According to Population Census 2011 performed by Bangladesh Bureau of Statistics, The total population of Gala union is 28266. There are 6484 households in total.

Education

The literacy rate of Gala Union is 52% (Male-56.6%, Female-47.3%).

See also
 Union Councils of Tangail District

References

Populated places in Dhaka Division
Populated places in Tangail District
Unions of Tangail Sadar Upazila